Lucius Cornelius Lentulus may refer to:

 Lucius Cornelius Lentulus (consul 199 BC)
 Lucius Cornelius Lentulus Lupus (consul 156 BC)
 Lucius Cornelius Lentulus (consul 130 BC)
 Lucius Cornelius Lentulus Crus, consul in 49 BC
 Lucius Cornelius Lentulus Cruscellio, suffect consul in 38 BC
 Lucius Cornelius Lentulus (consul 3 BC)